Mario Iván Martínez (born Mario Iván Martínez Morales on February 17, 1962) is a Mexican actor.

Filmography

Awards and nominations

References

External links

 Mario Iván Martínez Official Website

1962 births
Living people
Mexican male telenovela actors
Mexican male television actors
Mexican male film actors
Mexican male stage actors
Ariel Award winners
Best Actor Ariel Award winners
Male actors from Mexico City
20th-century Mexican male actors
21st-century Mexican male actors
People from Mexico City

es:Mario Iván Martínez